Emiliano Pattarello (born 30 July 1999) is an Italian football player. He plays for  club Arezzo.

Club career

Bologna 
Born in Dolo, Pattarello was a youth exponent of Bologna.

Loan to Renate 
On 1 July 2018, Pattarello was signed by Serie C club Renate on a season-long loan deal. Four weeks later, on 29 July, he made his debut for Renate as a substitute replacing Matteo Rossetti in the 46th minute of a 2–0 home defeat against Rezzato in the first round of Coppa Italia. On 30 September he made his Serie C debut as a substitute replacing Guido Gomez in the 84th minute of a 1–0 home defeat against Fermana. On 17 October, Pattarello played his first match as a starter, a 1–0 home defeat against Virtus Verona, he was replaced by Alberto Spagnoli in the 61st minute. Pattarello ended his loan to Renate with 17 appearances, but he never played any entire matches and without scoring any goals.

Loan to Arzignano 
On 20 July 2019, Pattarello was loaned to newly Serie C club Arzignano Valchiampo on a season-long loan deal. On 25 August he made his debut for the club in a 0–0 home draw against Piacenza, he played the entire match. He became Arzignano's first-choice early in the season. Pattarello ended his season-long loan to Arzignano with 23 appearances, including 13 as a starter, without scoring any goals and playing only one entire match, however Arzignano was relegated in Serie D after losing 2–1 on aggregate in the play-out against Imolese, he played both matches.

Arezzo
On 7 July 2022, Pattarello signed with Arezzo in Serie D.

Career statistics

Club

References

1999 births
People from Dolo
Sportspeople from the Metropolitan City of Venice
Living people
Italian footballers
Association football forwards
A.C. Renate players
F.C. Arzignano Valchiampo players
A.C. Trento 1921 players
S.S. Arezzo players
Serie C players
Serie D players
Footballers from Veneto